Crocus cyprius  is a species of flowering plant in the genus Crocus of the family Iridaceae. It is a cormous perennial native to Cyprus where it is found in the Troödos Mountains.

Plants flower from January to April and are found inhabiting areas with stony soils. The corm tunic is annulate (having rings) and papery.

References

cyprius